Louise Massey (born Victoria Louise Massey; 10 August 1902 – 20 June 1983, in San Angelo, Texas), American singer and songwriter born in Midland, Texas.  The Massey family left Texas while Louise Massey was very young and she grew up near Roswell in Lincoln County, New Mexico. In 1918, Louise's father, Henry Massey, started a band that featured himself and three of his eight children singing and playing musical instruments. Most of the children were able to play several instruments while dressed in “elaborate cowboy outfits as their stage attire,” Louise played piano and sang. The Massey’s music career began in 1920s, when they played and sang at local shows and church socials. At the age of 15, Louise married Milton Mabie, who also joined the group.

In 1930, the quintet known as "the Westerners" included Louise, Curt and Allen Massey, Milton Mabie, and Larry Wellington, who had replaced Henry Massey. Louise, with her flamboyant Spanish-style costumes, became the focal point of the act and received lead billing. The Westerners' first radio performance was on KMBC in Kansas City. They moved to WLS Radio in Chicago in 1933. In 1934, the song "When the White Azaleas Start Blooming" was released by the band and sold three million copies. In 1936, they moved to New York where they continued their radio work on NBC. In 1938, Louise Massey and the Westerners appeared in the Tex Ritter movie Where the Buffalo Roam. The group returned to WLS Radio in 1939 and did a morning broadcast on NBC called "Reveille Roundup."

In the early 1940s, the Westerners were "well known for numerous radio appearances" and were appearing on Plantation Party broadcasts three nights a week. Louise Massey recorded for several record labels including Vocalion Records, OKeh Records, and Conqueror Records.

Massey's house in Roswell is listed on the National Register of Historic Places.

Filmography
 Twilight on the Trail,  1937
Love Goes West, 1938
 Where the Buffalo Roam  1938

References

External links
Louise Massey and the Westerners

1902 births
1983 deaths
American women country singers
American country singer-songwriters
American women singer-songwriters
Country musicians from Texas
20th-century American singers
Singer-songwriters from Texas
20th-century American women singers